Vandarni or Vendarni or Vondarni may refer to:
 Vanderni-ye Olya
 Vanderni-ye Sofla